Samantha Lucie-Smith (born 26 July 1992) is a New Zealand swimmer. She competed in the 4 × 200 metre freestyle relay event at the 2012 Summer Olympics.

References

New Zealand female swimmers
1992 births
Olympic swimmers of New Zealand
Swimmers at the 2012 Summer Olympics
Living people
Swimmers at the 2014 Commonwealth Games
Commonwealth Games competitors for New Zealand